Andreas Schulz (born 5 October 1951) is a German rower who competed for East Germany in the 1976 Summer Olympics.

He was born in Freital. In 1976 he was a crew member of the East German boat which won the silver medal in the coxed fours event.

References

External links
 

1951 births
Living people
Olympic rowers of East Germany
Rowers at the 1976 Summer Olympics
Olympic silver medalists for East Germany
Olympic medalists in rowing
East German male rowers
World Rowing Championships medalists for East Germany
Medalists at the 1976 Summer Olympics
People from Freital
Sportspeople from Saxony